The Registrar of the Peerage is responsible for maintaining and updating the Roll of the Peerage.

History 

The Roll of the Peerage was created by warrant under the royal sign manual in 2004 to work similarly to the Official Roll of the Baronetage. The warrant provided for the Lord Chancellor to appoint a Registrar, which has always been the Deputy Clerk of the Crown in Chancery, and has been held in conjunction to that of Registrar of the Baronetage.

There is also an Assistant Registrar who deputises for the Registrar, and examine succession claims while also maintaining and upkeeping the Roll. This role is held in conjunction with that of Deputy Head of the Crown Office.

List of Registrars

References 

Crown Office
English law
Ministry of Justice (United Kingdom)
Civil Service (United Kingdom)
Peerages in the United Kingdom